Piero Borgi (Venice, 1424–1484) was a versatile Italian mathematician.  Borgi is the author of several of the best Italian books on mathematics written in the 15th century. Borgi's books include , written in 1483; Arithmetica, written in 1484, a book on arithmetic; and Il Libro de Abacho de Arithmetica e De Arte Mathematiche. The later book was so successful that it went through seventeen editions.

Notes

External links
St Andrews College
D E Smith, The First Great Commercial Arithmetic, Isis 8 (1) (1926), 41–49.

1424 births
1484 deaths
15th-century Italian mathematicians